Graham Cole OBE (born Graham Coleman-Smith on 16 March 1952) is an English actor.

Early life
Cole was born in Willesden in 1952 to Victor and Freda Coleman-Smith (née Coleman), the youngest of three children.

He was part of the film crew of A Clockwork Orange, although he didn't meet the stars. It was when he took part in a staff pantomime, that his colleagues persuaded him to take up a career in showbusiness.

Career
He appeared in numerous episodes of Doctor Who in the early 1980s, often in uncredited roles, such as Marshman and then a Cyberman in Earthshock. He has also played Melkur in The Keeper of Traken and finally a Jacondan in The Twin Dilemma. He also made a guest appearance in the final series of Sooty and Co as a detective called Maurice in the episode "Delgrub" and in Only Fools and Horses as a Spanish customs official. His first film appearance as a '00' agent in the James Bond film The Living Daylights in 1987. Cole then appeared in Indiana Jones and the Last Crusade. As one of Walter Donovan's henchmen, who escort Indiana Jones to their boss's New York apartment.  

He is best known as PC Tony Stamp in the ITV police drama The Bill, a role he played initially as a recurring character from 1984, and then as a regular from 1988 until 2009. Cole appeared in more episodes of the programme than any other actor, appearing in 1,202 episodes. He had previously spent 12 years in Repertory Theatre, and musicals.

He presented and narrated the police video programme Police Stop!. He appeared regularly on Noel's House Party in sketches with Andrew Paul. Cole was gunged on the show, which was arranged by his mother-in-law. He has also made a guest appearance in ITV series Law & Order: UK as a barman in one episode.

Cole is also a singer. In his early career Cole appeared as the Emperor of China in a record-breaking 1978/79 season of Aladdin at the Grand Theatre in Swansea. Other pantomime appearances have included the role of "Beast" in Beauty & The Beast at the Woodville Halls in Gravesend, Kent. To date he has appeared in 36 pantomimes.  He played Scrooge to critical acclaim at Garrick Theatre Lichfield in 2012 and Abanazer for Theater Royal Norwich, 2013–2014. He Played General Waverley In  Irving Berlin's White Christmas at The Festival Theatre Edinburgh.

He then returned to the role in 2015/16 to record breaking houses at The Dominion Theatre London.

Cole starred in the gangster-horror film Evil Never Dies in 2014, as DI David Bracken, a film that also starred Katy Manning, P.H. Moriarty and former The Bill colleague Tony Scannell. Cole made appearances in Doctors (2015) and Holby City (2018), before starring in the romantic-drama film 23 Walks in 2020 with Alison Steadman.

Personal life
Cole is a member of the showbusiness charity the Grand Order of Water Rats and held the title King Rat in 2009. He is President of the National Holiday Fund, which takes sick and disabled children to Disney World in Florida. He has been a patron of ChildLine for over 25 years and is the president of Greater London South East Scout County.

Cole supports emergency service charities with his patronage. He is a patron of the Orphans' Gift Fund South East London Boroughs of the Constables Branch Board of the Metropolitan Police and of the charity PTSD999. He is a Voluntary Police Cadets ambassador.

Cole was awarded an OBE in 2010 for his continuing work with charities. Cole is married and has two children.

He was the subject of This Is Your Life in 1997 when he was surprised by Michael Aspel.

Filmography

Film

Television

References

External links

English male film actors
English male soap opera actors
People from Willesden
1952 births
Living people
Officers of the Order of the British Empire